The following is a list of railway stations in Cambodia currently in operation.

Western line
 Phnom Penh 
 Samrong 
 Batdeng 
 Tbeng Khpos 
 Mea Nork 
 Romeas 
 Kraing Skea 
 Kdol 
 Bomnak 
 Kamreng 
 Pursat
 Tropang Chorng
 Moeung Khnar 
 Maung Russey 
 Phnom Thiphdei 
 Battambang 
 Thmor Kor 
 Phnom Touch 
 Mongkol Borei 
 Sisophon
 Poipet

Southern line
 Phnom Penh 
 Takéo
 Damnak Chang Aeur (Kep) - (opening late 2019)
 Kampot
 Veal Renh - (opening late 2018)
 Sihanoukville

See also
 Rail transport in Cambodia

References

External links

Railway stations
Cambodia
railway stations